Kolorblind (stylized in all caps) is the debut album by Atlanta-based producer William "DJ Esco" Moore. It was released on March 30, 2018, via Freebandz/Epic Records. It features guest appearances from Future, Young Thug, A Boogie wit da Hoodie, Dej Loaf, Nas, O.T. Genasis, Rich the Kid, Schoolboy Q, Ty Dolla $ign and Guap Tarantino. The album peaked at number 38 on the US Billboard 200 chart, and became the first artist's project to reach the charts.

Track listing

Chart history

References

External links 

 KOLORBLIND on Discogs
 KOLORBLIND on iTunes

2018 albums
Epic Records albums
Albums produced by Metro Boomin